Augustin Sageret (27 July 1763 – 23 March 1851) was a French botanist.

In 1826, Sageret carried out an experiment that involved hybridizing a muskmelon with a cantaloupe. He has been described as a precursor to Gregor Mendel.

References

1763 births
1851 deaths
19th-century French botanists
Proto-evolutionary biologists
18th-century French botanists